The papal conclave held from 24 February to 31 March 1829 to elect a successor to the recently deceased Leo XII resulted in the accession of Cardinal Francesco Castiglioni, who took the name Pius VIII.

It took a long time for the conclave to elect a new pope due to conflict between secular governments concerning who should be elected. Cardinal Emmanuele De Gregorio was the proposed candidate of the pro-French faction and the zelanti (conservative cardinals), whilst Cardinal Bartolomeo Pacca was proposed by the more moderate cardinals but was not accepted by the French government of the Bourbon Restoration period, headed by King Charles X and Prime Minister Jean Baptiste Gay, vicomte de Martignac. Pacca was also seen by many in the conclave as being too gentle to be an effective pope.

Description

The conclave did not move rapidly. The arrival of Giuseppe Albani caused the votes to center on Francesco Saverio Castiglioni. With the supporters of both De Gregorio and of Pacca unable to secure enough votes to elect their candidate to the papacy, Castiglioni came to be seen as a suitable compromise candidate. Castiglioni had been close to election in the 1823 conclave as the representative of the politicanti (moderate cardinals) and had all the qualifications to become Pope, though he had the problem of being in very poor health, but was not elected at the last conclave when the zelanti Cardinals came to realize that he was quite close to Cardinal Ercole Consalvi.  Consalvi however was already dead by the time of the 1829 conclave having died during the pontificate of Pope Leo XII.

On 31 March, Cardinal Castiglioni was elected pope. Given that Castiglioni had been called Pius VIII by Pope Pius VII even before his death in 1823, and that in the 1823 conclave Leo XII had said that Castiglioni "some day was to be Pius VIII", it was a foregone conclusion that he would take that regnal name upon becoming Pope.

References

1829 in the Papal States
1829
1829 elections
1829 elections in Europe
19th-century Catholicism
1829 in Christianity
February 1829 events